Monocle is a global affairs and lifestyle magazine, 24-hour radio station, website, retailer and media brand, produced by Winkreative Ltd. It was founded by Tyler Brûlé, a Canadian entrepreneur, Financial Times columnist, and founder of Wallpaper* magazine.

The magazine was founded and based in London on 15 February 2007. In September 2014, Brûlé sold a minority stake in Monocle magazine to Japanese publisher Nikkei Inc. The deal valued Monocle at about U.S. $115 million, although the size of Nikkei's investment was undisclosed. In December 2014, Monocle launched a new annual publication called The Forecast, intended to fill the gap between the Dec./Jan. and February issues of Monocle. The Escapist, a travel-minded annual magazine, was introduced in July 2015 and focuses on in-depth reportage of 10 cities around the world.

Concept 
Along with a small group of private investors, Brûlé created and financed Monocle, a 10-times-a-year print magazine, in 2007. The first published based in London on 15 February 2007. The magazine, all in English with no regional editions, addressed a mobile global audience. Hamilton Nolan, journalist for Gawker, described it as "a lifestyle magazine for young, stylish, business-oriented jet setters who receive free subscriptions". It had also previously been described on Gawker as a "travel-culture magazine" and a repository of "lifestyle sensuality and gaywad uptightness".

In June 2010, Monocle launched a summer newspaper, Monocle Mediterraneo. The newspaper directly opposed the iPad trend, with Brûlé declaring you cannot read an iPad on the beach. In December 2010 Monocle launched a winter newspaper, Monocle Alpino.   The magazine believes in print media, and has neither a Facebook nor a Twitter account. Both newspapers were discontinued as of December 2014 and replaced by The Forecast and The Escapist magazines.

As well as regular advertisements, Monocle runs advertorials. In the September 2009 issue, for example, there was a large insert on Singapore, with a survey paid for by the government of Singapore and several large companies there, but articles generated by the magazine staff in the style of the magazine.

Monocle has also carried separate surveys on a wide range of cities, countries and regions, and has developed a network of correspondents around the globe who are listed on the magazine's masthead. These correspondents are in Perth, Paris, Washington, Nairobi, Belgrade, Warsaw and Bogotá, among other places.

In September 2015, Monocle started The Monocle Minute, daily email bulletin of news, opinions and opportunities, also published on its website.

In the Editor's Letter in the December 2017/January 2018 issue, Brûlé announced that as from 1 March 2018, all of his media holdings would be based in Zurich, Switzerland.

Website 
Monocle's website contains magazine archive content only available to paid subscribers, and 3 free-to-read articles per issue. It also contains over 500 films, slideshows and documentaries that are available to the public. The film content is also available on iTunes and YouTube.

The website sells products designed by the magazine's in-house team, as well as products developed in collaboration with brands including Comme des Garçons, Loopwheeler, A Kind of Guise, Private White V.C. and Porter. These are also sold in Monocle shops in London, Hong Kong, Toronto, Tokyo, Singapore and New York, as well as a series of seasonal pop-up stores.

Monocle's internet radio station, Monocle 24 can also be accessed from the website and an iOS app. Listeners can tune in live or browse the archive of all the station's speech-based shows.

Initially launched alongside the magazine in 2007, the website was redesigned in November 2012. In 2013, the relaunched website picked up several awards at The Lovie Awards including a Gold award for Best Writing- Editorial, Silver for Lifestyle and Bronze for Best Practices.

Retail 
Monocle opened its London shop in November 2008, followed by shops in, Hong Kong, Toronto, Tokyo, Singapore, New York and Culver City (in Los Angeles County). Monocle also operates seasonal pop-up stores. The Monocle stores vend accessories and apparel items that are relevant to travelers,  including collaborations with niche brands.

Radio 

Monocle 24 is an internet radio station, broadcasting from Monocle's headquarters at Midori House in London. On weekdays, the station produces three live, current affairs-based programs. It also broadcasts weekly shows on business; culture; design; food and hospitality; print media, urbanism and more. Music hours, short-format shows and reports fill the rest of the schedule, hosted by Monocle staff. Monocle 24 was launched in October 2011 and broadcasts in English, primarily from London, but with an international focus. Around 80% of listening is via download, 20% via live streaming. Monocle 24 has broadcast more than 60 different programs and podcasts since it was founded and produces all its content in-house. With more than 30 premieres every week, Monocle 24 produces more shows and podcasts than any other independent media brand. 

The Monocle Weekly

Monocle 24 itself grew out of The Monocle Weekly, a podcast which first appeared on 28 December 2008. Hosted by Andrew Tuck and Robert Bound, it covers topics such as politics, business and culture and features interviews with big names across several disciplines, and eventually hit download figures as high as 250,000 per month. The Monocle Weekly became a one-hour weekend show on the station and is still available as a podcast.

Station history

Monocle 24 launched on 17 October 2011 with four live shows on weekdays: The Globalist, The Briefing, Midori House and The Monocle Daily, as well as several extra shows over the weekend. Surrounding those shows were music hours known as The Continental Shift and The Atlantic Shift, as well as hour-long themed shows Culture with Robert Bound, Section D, The Entrepreneurs, The Urbanist and The Menu. The station was branded by bespoke music idents, including a number featuring the voice of pop star Kylie Minogue and the Quiet Nights Orchestra. The running time of The Briefing, Midori House, Culture, Section D, The Entrepreneurs, The Urbanist and The Menu was cut from 50 to 30 minutes starting on 2 March 2015. At the same time, new programs, such as The Big Interview and The Monocle Arts Review were added to the schedule. Top-of-the-hour newscasts were also removed from the schedule.

The station is influenced by the BBC World Service. Tyler Brûlé said "From the point of view its ambitions for global reach and coverage of world affairs, Monocle 24 will probably resemble and sound like many commonwealth public service broadcasters, including BBC World Service, as well as shades of Australia's ABC and Canada’s CBC. We are hoping to create a station which follows the tradition of the great Commonwealth broadcasters. It’s no surprise that we have drawn a lot of great people from the BBC World Service."

Changes to the schedule since its launch have included the introduction in August 2012 of The Stack, a 25-minute-long show on magazines and print media hosted by Tyler Brûlé on Saturday mornings. In April 2013, The Globalist was split into The Globalist and The Globalist Asia, with the latter focusing more on listeners in Asia, Australia and New Zealand. The Globalist Asia was last broadcast on 27 December 2013.

Saturday and Sunday feature the Weekend Edition, a mix of news, interviews, music and highlights.

Portions of Monocle 24 programs were previously broadcast on ABC Radio National in Australia. Other Monocle 24 output is also broadcast by CBC Radio One in Canada as part of CBC Radio Overnight.

Monocle 24 also broadcasts from political, business and cultural events.

The station is live 24 hours a day at monocle.com/radio and records more than 1 million listens to its programming every month through the Monocle website and across all internet radio and podcast platforms.

Programme schedule

Monocle 24 has broadcast more than 60 different programmes and podcasts since its launch. 

The current roster includes long-running, weekday news shows; 

 The Globalist
 The Briefing
 The Monocle Daily

Award-winning weekly international affairs shows;

 The Foreign Desk
 Monocle on Culture
 Monocle on Design
 The Entrepreneurs
 The Urbanist
 The Menu
 The Stack
 The Big Interview
 The Chiefs with Tyler Brûlé
 The Curator
 Meet The Writers
 The Bulletin with UBS.  

A number of the weekly magazine shows have companion strands like;

 The Entrepreneur’s Eureka show
 Tall Stories from The Urbanist team
 Monocle On Design Extra
 The Foreign Desk Explainer.

Monocle 24 also produces and broadcasts Konfekt Korner, the monthly podcast from sister title Konfekt magazine hosted by Konfekt Editor Sophie Grove.

Past programmes and content

Monocle 24 has broadcast more than 60 different programmes and podcasts since its launch. From 17 October 2011 to 2 March 2015, the station broadcast its own newscasts at the top of the hour between 6 am and 11 pm London time. Tomasz Schafernaker provided recorded weather forecasts for the station, but they were quickly dropped. Aperitivo (16 Sept 2013 - 15 November 2013) was a short-lived news-based talk programme, trailed as a "relaxed blend of conversation and analysis." The Globalist, a show on international news and political issues, was originally two hours long. It was later split in two, the second hour becoming The Globalist Asia, which was last broadcast on 27 December 2013. The Review was a weekend show which featured stories about books, movies and theatre. From launch to 2 March 2015, the station broadcast ABC Radio news bulletins between midnight and 5 am London time.

Sponsorship

Current sponsors of Monocle 24 programmes include UBS, Novartis and Allianz. 

Previous sponsors and brands that Monocle 24 has worked with to create original audio content include Air Canada, ANZ, Audi, Blackberry, BMW, Breitling, Chanel, Conrad, Diageo, Dubai, GE, The Glenlivet, Grundig, HP, Hyundai, Japan Cabinet Office, J Crew, Kaspersky, Korean Air, Krug, Kuoni, Leuchtturm, Lexus, Lombard Odier, Longines, Lufthansa, Marriott, Moncler, Mubi, Nike, Pictet, Rimowa, Rolex, Samsung, Shinola, Squarespace, Südtirol, Tag Heuer, Thailand, Tiffany, Turkish Airlines and Zurich Tourism.

Tag Heuer was the station's "digital timekeeper" from 11 October 2015 to summer 2016. Previously, Rolex had a similar role, with ads running at the top of the hour.

Presenters

Some of the most frequently heard voices on Monocle 24 are those of magazine staff, such as Tyler Brûlé, Andrew Tuck and Robert Bound. However, there are also regular radio staff, such as Tom Edwards, Markus Hippi and Daniel Bach, whose voices can be heard across many shows. Other presenters include Georgina Godwin, Emma Nelson and Monocle Contributing Editor Andrew Mueller.

There are also regular contributions from Monocle staff and guests at the organization's bureaux in New York, Tokyo, Hong Kong and Toronto and the other editorial hub in Zürich.

Books 
In 2013, Monocle published their first book in collaboration with Berlin publisher Gestalten. The Monocle Guide to Better Living has since been joined by The Monocle Guide to Good Business, The Monocle Guide to Cosy Homes, How to Make a Nation: A Monocle Guide, and The Monocle Guide to Drinking and Dining. They also have a series of travel guides with Gestalten, covering cities including Hong Kong, Istanbul, London, Madrid, New York, Rio de Janeiro, and Tokyo.

Other media 
Six episodes of a Monocle TV show were broadcast internationally on Bloomberg in early 2011.

Café 
In April 2013, Monocle opened the Monocle Café at 18 Chiltern Street, London W1. Its interior was designed by the magazine's senior designer Yoshi Takagi and built by EDO Construction. The café sells Allpress coffee and a library of Monocle magazines and books. The company also had a café in Tokyo in the Hankyu Men's department store with furniture made by Maruni.

In October 2015, Monocle opened Kioskafé - a magazine shop and coffee bar. Modelled on European city kiosks, it sells over 150 magazines ranging from art, design, fashion, culture and more. Situated close to London Paddington station, the space was opened as a place devoted to great independent magazines with the number of independent newsagents in decline.

In 2018, Monocle opened a Café with shop and men's fashion outlet in Seefeld, Zurich.

Monocle surveys 

Monocle's annual Quality of Life issue ranks the top 25 most livable cities in the world. In 2016, Tokyo was declared the winning city. In 2015, Monocle launched its first Quality of Life conference in Lisbon; the conference was held in Vienna in April 2016. The Quality of Life Conference aims to bring together leading voices from the worlds of design, urbanism and culture over three days, and the host city changes annually.

Since 2010, Monocle has also published an annual Soft Power survey ranking countries according to their ability to promote themselves in the world via culture, diplomacy and trade. In 2016, the US was the winner.

Accolades 
In 2011, Monocle was awarded one of the top ten titles of the year by AdAge USA's 'A List', and Brûlé was named Editor of the Year. In 2015, it won a D&AD Wood Pencil award for its publication, The Forecast.

Criticisms 
In 2018, Amalia Illgner wrote an article for The Guardian about her experience working for Monocle in London where she claimed "Monocle interns are paid £30" per day. An employment tribunal resulted in admission of liability from Monocle and subsequent settlement.

See also 
Luxury magazine
Departures
Worth
Robb Report
High net worth individual
Ultra high net worth individual

References

External links

 

Lifestyle magazines published in the United Kingdom
Design magazines
Cultural magazines published in the United Kingdom
Magazines established in 2007
News magazines published in the United Kingdom
Mass media companies of the United Kingdom
Magazines published in London
Podcasting companies